Snake  Man, Snake Men or snake people may refer to:

Characters
 The Snake Men (Masters of The Universe), a line of Masters of the Universe toys
 Serpent Men, a fictional race created by Robert E. Howard and appearing in the Cthulhu Mythos
 The Snake People, a group of henchmen in The Archer: Fugitive from the Empire
 Snake Man, a character in Mega Man 3

Films
 Snakeman (film), a 2005 Syfy TV film
 Snake People (film) or Isle of the Snake People, a horror film starring Boris Karloff

Other uses
 "The Snake Man", an 18th-century short story by Pu Songling
 Snake Man of La Perouse, an animal show in Sydney, Australia
 Constantine John Philip Ionides (1901-1968), known as the Snake Man of British East Africa, herpetologist
 Raymond Hoser or Snake-Man (born 1962), herpetologist
 Snake Indians, a trio of indigenous northern plains tribes in the United States

See also
List of reptilian humanoids
Snake woman (disambiguation)